María Cecilia Chacón Rendón is a Bolivian lawyer, political scientist who served as the minister of defense in 2011. She became the first woman to occupy that office. She served as General Director of Multilateral Relations and Chief of Cabinet for the Vice Ministry of Foreign Economic and Commercial Relations in the foreign ministry under President Evo Morales. She also worked in the Water Ministry.

She resigned from the post of minister of defense during the 2011 Bolivian protests in reaction to the governments violent crackdown on demonstrators opposed to a highway project in a national park.

References

Defense ministers of Bolivia
Living people
Female defence ministers
Year of birth missing (living people)
21st-century Bolivian women politicians
21st-century Bolivian politicians